A federal union is a political system of government.

Federal Union may also refer to a number of political movements:
 Federal Union (est. 1938), a British political group advocating European federalism
  (1951-1957), a West German parliamentary alliance of center-right Christian and regional parties around the Zentrum
 Federalist Union (Unione Federalista), a former name (1994-1995) of the Federalist Party  (1994-2008), an Italian political party
 Federal Union Army (est. 2011), an insurgent coalition in Myanmar
 Federal Union Party (est. 2013), a Burmese political party

See also 
 The Federal Union (1937), an American book about the history of the United States
 Federal Party (disambiguation)
 Union Party (disambiguation)
 Unionist Party (disambiguation)
 Federal (disambiguation)
 Federalism (disambiguation)
 Federalist (disambiguation)
 Federation (disambiguation)